Elizabeth Lipski  is a clinical nutritionist and author of several books on nutrition and digestion.

Lipski has been working in the field of nutrition, holistic health, herbology, lifestyle management, and relaxation and visualization techniques, for over 30 years. She has worked in medicine and academia and was most recently named Director of Academic Development, Nutrition & Integrative Health at the Maryland University of Integrative Health. Lipski also does frequent media interviews and advises businesses on issues of employee health and wellness.

Board Certifications 
 Institute for Functional Medicine Certified Practitioner (IFMCP)
 Fellow of the American College of Nutrition (FACN)
 Certified Nutrition Specialist (CNS)
 Certified in Holistic Nutrition (BCHN)

Licenses 
 Licensed Dietitian-Nutritionist (LDN)

Positions 

Lipski currently holds the following positions:
 Director of Academic Development, Nutrition & Integrative Health, Maryland University of Integrative Health
 Founder, Innovative Healing Inc.
 Faculty, Institute for Functional Medicine
 Faculty, Autism Research Institute
 Advisory Board, Autism Hope Alliance
 Advisory Board - Food as Medicine
 Advisory Board - Ceres Foundation

Publications

Books

References 

Year of birth missing (living people)
Living people
American women nutritionists
American nutritionists
American health activists
American educators
American health and wellness writers
American women non-fiction writers
21st-century American women